The 2019–20 Pac-12 Conference men's basketball season began with practices in October 2019 followed by the 2019–20 NCAA Division I men's basketball season in November 2019. The conference schedule began in December 2019. This was the eighth season under the Pac–12 Conference name and the 60th since the conference was established under its current charter as the Athletic Association of Western Universities in 1959. Including the history of the Pacific Coast Conference, which operated from 1915 to 1959 and is considered by the Pac-12 as a part of its own history, this is the Pac-12's 104th season of basketball.

The Pac-12 tournament was scheduled from March 11–14, 2020 at the T-Mobile Arena in Paradise, Nevada.  On March 12, the Pac-12 cancelled the tournament prior to its second round due to the COVID-19 pandemic.

Pre-season

Recruiting classes

Preseason watchlists
Below is a table of notable preseason watch lists.

Preseason All-American teams

Preseason polls

Pac-12 Media days
Source:

Early season tournaments

Pac-12 Preseason All-Conference

First Team

Second Team

Honorable Mention

 October 8, 2019  – Pac-12 Men's Basketball Media Day, Pac-12 Networks Studios, San Francisco, Calif.

Midseason watchlists
Below is a table of notable midseason watch lists.

Final watchlists
Below is a table of notable year end watch lists.

Regular season
The Schedule will be released in late September. Before the season, it was announced that for the seventh consecutive season, all regular season conference games and conference tournament games would be broadcast nationally by CBS Sports, FOX Sports, ESPN Inc. family of networks including ESPN, ESPN2 and ESPNU, and the Pac-12 Network.

Records against other conferences
2019–20 records against non-conference foes:

Regular Season

Record against ranked non-conference opponents
This is a list of games against ranked opponents only (Rankings from the AP Poll):

Team rankings are reflective of AP poll when the game was played, not current or final ranking

† denotes game was played on neutral site

Conference schedule
This table summarizes the head-to-head results between teams in conference play.

Points scored

Through March 10, 2020

Rankings

Head coaches

Coaching changes
On December 31, 2018, UCLA fired head coach Steve Alford after 5½ seasons and named assistant coach Murry Bartow interim head coach for the remainder of the season. On April 9, 2019, Cincinnati head coach Mick Cronin was named the new head coach of the Bruins.

On March 14, 2019, Washington State fired head coach Ernie Kent after 5 seasons. On March 27, San Francisco head coach Kyle Smith was named the new head coach of the Cougars.

On March 24, 2019, California fired head coach Wyking Jones after 2 seasons. On March 29, the Golden Bears hired former Georgia head coach Mark Fox for the head coaching job.

Coaches
Note: Stats shown are before the beginning of the season. Overall and Pac-12 records are from time at current school.

Notes:
 Overall and Pac-12 records, conference titles, etc. are from time at current school and are through the end the 2018–19 season.
 NCAA tournament appearances are from time at current school only.
 NCAA Final Fours and Championship include time at other schools

Post season

Pac-12 tournament

The conference tournament was scheduled for March 11–14, 2020, at the T-Mobile Arena, Paradise, NV. The top four teams had a bye on the first day. Teams were seeded by conference record, with ties broken by record between the tied teams followed by record against the regular-season champion, if necessary.  On March 12, the Pac 12 announced the tournament would be canceled due to the COVID-19 pandemic.

NCAA tournament

Number of teams from the conference were selected to participate:

National Invitation Tournament 
Number of teams from the conference were selected to participate:

Awards and honors

Players of the Week 
Throughout the conference regular season, the Pac-12 offices named one or two players of the week each Monday.

Totals per School

All-Americans

Payton Pritchard, Oregon, First team (Associated Press, Sporting News)

All-District
The United States Basketball Writers Association (USBWA) named the following from the Pac-12 to their All-District Teams:
District VIII

All-District Team
Timmy Allen, Utah
McKinley Wright IV, Colorado

District IX
Player of the Year
Payton Pritchard, Oregon

All-District Team
Remy Martin, Arizona State
Zeke Nnaji, Arizona
Onyeka Okongwu, USC
Payton Pritchard, Oregon
Isaiah Stewart, Washington
Tres Tinkle, Oregon State

Conference awards
Voting was by conference coaches.

Individual awards

All-Pac-12

First Team

 ‡ Pac-12 Player of the Year
 ††† three-time All-Pac-12 First Team honoree
 †† two-time All-Pac-12 First Team honoree
 † two-time All-Pac-12 honoree

Second Team

Honorable Mention
Chris Duarte (ORE, G)
Tyrell Terry (STAN, G)
Alonzo Verge Jr. (ASU, G)

All-Freshman Team

‡ Pac-12 Freshman of the Year
Honorable Mention
Jaime Jaquez Jr. (UCLA, G)

All-Defensive Team

‡Pac-12 Defensive Player of the Year
†† two-time Pac-12 All-Defensive Team honoree
Honorable Mention
Chris Duarte (ORE, G)
Jalen Hill (UCLA, F)
Jervae Robinson (WSU, G)
Dylan Smith (ARIZ, G).

All-Academic team
The Pac-12 moved to seasonal Academic Honor Rolls, discontinuing sport-by-sport teams, starting in 2019-20 

‡ indicates player was Pac-12 Scholar-Athlete of the Year
†† two-time Pac-12 All-Academic honoree
††† three-time Pac-12 All-Academic honoree

2020 NBA draft

Home game attendance 

Bold – At or Exceed capacity
†Season High

Notes

References